Bačić is a surname found in Croatia and Serbia. It may refer to:

 Doris Bačić (born 1995), Croatian football player
 Lazar Bačić (1865–1941), Croatian Serb merchant and philanthropist
 Lidija Bačić (born 1985), Croatian singer
 Slaven Bačić (born 1965), Serbian Croat jurist
 Steve Bacic (born 1965), Canadian actor of Croatian origin

Croatian surnames
Serbian surnames